In medicine, Evar or EVAR may refer to:
Endovascular aneurysm repair or Endovascular repair of abdominal aortic aneurysm

EVaR may refer to:
Entropic value at risk

People with the name Evar include:
Evar Swanson (1902–1973), American football and baseball player
Evar Saar (born 1969), Estonian linguist
Evar Orbus, fictional character from the Star Wars expanded universe

See also
Ever (disambiguation)
Ivar (disambiguation)